The Paleorrota Geopark Project was established in Preparatory Procedure No. 1.29.008.000640/2017-22 done at the Public Prosecutor's Office (Brazil) of Santa Maria, Rio Grande do Sul. The geopark is composed of the Permian and Triassic areas in the central region of Rio Grande do Sul. It emerged in 2007 in the worldwide computer network to aggregate more than 48 municipalities in Rio Grande do Sul. The project aims to meet the standards of UNESCO Geoparks in which Brazil is a signatory.

External links
http://paleorrota.wixsite.com/paleorrota Grupo Paleorrota.

Geoparks in Brazil
Rio Grande do Sul